The Invader: a tale of adventure and passion is a novel by Welsh author Hilda Vaughan. It was published by Heinemann in the UK and by Harper & Brothers in the US.

Synopsis
Daniel Evans, a tenant farmer, is forced out of his farm when Miss Webster inherits it from her uncle. Through his tenacity, he attempts to get his farm back.

Publication
The Invader was Vaughn's third novel, published in 1928.

Her husband, Charles Langbridge Morgan, persuaded her to delay its publication, on the grounds that her writing would improve.

Reception
The novel was well received, and was described by Country Life as "one of the best novels of this year."

References

Sources
 

Novels by Hilda Vaughan
1928 British novels
Heinemann (publisher) books
Harper & Brothers books